Masela (Marsela) is the language of Marsela Island in southern Maluku, Indonesia. Regional varieties are distinct; Ethnologue counts it as three languages.

References

Further reading
Taber, Mark (1993). "Toward a Better Understanding of the Indigenous Languages of Southwestern Maluku." Oceanic Linguistics, Vol. 32, No. 2 (Winter, 1993), pp. 389–441. University of Hawai'i.

Babar languages
Languages of the Maluku Islands